Brachypodium firmifolium is a yellowish or glaucous-green perennial grass with slender erect or decumbent culms up to 45 cm high. Flowering: June–July.

Habitat
Igneous mountainsides, usually in damp shaded grounds by streams and cataracts, sometimes in open forest or meadows at 1000–1700 m altitude.

Distribution
Endemic to Cyprus, locally common in the Troödos area.

References

External links and further reading

firmifolium
Endemic flora of Cyprus